Partizánske District is a district in the Trenčín Region of Western Slovakia. It had been established in 1996, district area was previously a part of Topoľčany District. Partizánske district consists of 23 municipalities, from which 1 has a town status. Its main economic and cultural center is its seat Partizánske. Industry is a dominant branch. Density of population is ca. 1.5 times higher, than average is Slovakia.

Municipalities

References

Districts of Slovakia
Trenčín Region